Red Sun is a 1970 West German thriller film directed by Rudolf Thome and starring Marquard Bohm, Uschi Obermaier, Diana Körner, Sylvia Kekulé and Gaby Go.

Plot summary

Cast

References

Citations

General bibliography

External links
 
 

1970 films
1970s thriller films
Films directed by Rudolf Thome
1970s German-language films
German thriller films
West German films
1970s German films